An online text-based role playing game is a role-playing game played online using a solely text-based interface.  Online text-based role playing games date to 1978, with the creation of MUD1, which began the MUD heritage that culminates in today's MMORPGs. Some online-text based role playing games are video games, but some are organized and played entirely by humans through text-based communication.  Over the years, games have used TELNET, internet forums, IRC, email and social networking websites as their media.

There are varied genres of online text-based roleplaying, including fantasy, drama, horror, anime, science fiction, and media-based fan role-play. Role-playing games based on popular media (for example, the Harry Potter series) are common, and the players involved tend to overlap with the relevant fandoms.

Varieties

MUDs

Precursor to the now more popular MMORPGs of today are the branch of text-based games known as MUD, MOO, MUCK, MUSH et al., a broad family of server software tracing their origins back to MUD1 and being used to implement a variety of games and other services.  Many of these platforms implement Turing-complete programming languages and can be used for any purpose, but various types of server have historical and traditional associations with particular uses: "mainstream" MUD servers like LPMud and DikuMUD are typically used to implement combat-focused games, while the TinyMUD family of servers, sometimes referred to by the term MU*, are more usually used to create "social MUDs" devoted to role-playing and socializing, or non-game services such as educational MUDs.  While these are often seen as definitive boundaries, exceptions abound; many MUSHes have a software-supported combat system, while a "Role-Playing Intensive MUD" movement occurred primarily in the DikuMUD world, and both the first Internet talker (a type of purely social server) and the very popular talker software ew-too were based on LPMud code.  Although interest in these games has suffered from the popularity of MMORPGs, a large number of them still operate.

Play-by-post and PBEM

Play-by-post role-playing games or PBP RPGs refer to another type of text-based gaming. Rather than following gameplay in real-time, such as in MUDs, players post messages on such media as bulletin boards, online forums, Chatrooms (such as like AOL, hangouts and Yahoo chat) and mailing lists to which their fellow players will post role-played responses without a real limit or timeframe. Of late such blogging tools and sites as LiveJournal have been utilized for this purpose. This includes such games as play-by-email (or PBEM) RPGs. The origins of this style of role-playing are unknown, but it most likely originated in some form during the mid-to-late 1980s when BBS systems began gaining in popularity.
Usually it is played through 'Script' and 'Story' format, both styles are interchangeable and work well but it depends on which the player prefers, or which the human administrator insists upon.  Script format is a simple stating of what each character is saying, post by post, with little to no mention of said characters' actions, whereas Story format requires that the character's actions be mentioned, including the surroundings and a general description of what is going on.

Real-time human-moderated
Some games rely entirely upon human moderators to dictate events, and physical print books for rules sets. Such games may use code dice-rollers, to generate random results, and may include databases for the purposes of maintaining character records. Interaction between characters is controlled by communication between individual players (with each other) and with moderators (who portray non-player characters). Communication software and database options vary, from the DigiChat front-end / character database back-end pairing pioneered by Conrad Hubbard at White Wolf Publishing, to the numerous AOL, hangouts and Yahoo chats with hosted character databases. Many games also choose to play on Internet Relay Chat on networks such as DarkMyst and SorceryNet. More robust options are available on many virtual tabletops.  Some virtual tabletops include text chat in addition to map and image sharing, campaign management and more. Free-form games may even do away with database integration or dice-rollers entirely and rely upon individual players to keep their own records, with online community reputation dictating how other players react.

Characteristics and social aspects
These methods of role-playing have many advantages and disadvantages in comparison with more traditional, off-line role playing systems. On the one hand, text-based games allows players to exercise their writing skills, while using writing as a medium. The internet also makes it relatively easier for individuals to meet and play together. This freedom, though it is a great strength to the system, also has the potential to be a great weakness. Such broad freedom of expression can easily be grossly abused, most often by new players unfamiliar with the mostly unwritten etiquette of the text-based gaming community. This has caused many more experienced players to form tight knit cliques, which can also be detrimental to new players seeking to join the community. As a result, many sites are labeled for three levels of role-playing: 'beginner' 'intermediate' or 'advanced'.  While some sites usually have some sort of application process to judge a new member's ability to role-play, others allow users to choose their level as they create their character. Certain MUDs that are "Newbie-friendly" also maintain "Newbie" channels that are run by more experienced users for the sole purpose of teaching new users. These advanced players often answer questions and teach these "newbies" things they should and should not do throughout the game. Types of behavior commonly considered breaches of etiquette include powergaming and godmoding.

Another aspect of note is the development of a role-playing vocabulary that are almost exclusively limited to those who have experience with or are actively immersed in this pursuit as a hobby. Some terms overlap with those in commonly used in popular fandom. Terms as Mary Sue, slash, powergaming, godmoding, OOC, and IC are among the terms used with relative frequency in text-based role-playing circles, and it has come to be expected of role-players to be familiar with such jargon.

Consent 
The term "consent" refers to players' "veto power" over what happens to their player characters. Often referred to in the rolling roleplay community as "orthodox", "unorthodox", and "hybrid". Levels of consent might be:

 Non-consent:  This does not necessarily mean that they use a traditional role-playing game system: it could just be that consequences are enforced based on a "common sense" basis, e.g., if several police officers go to seize a character, even without dice rolls, an administrator might say that the only reasonable outcome is that the character is brought into custody.  Or, if there is such a system, this means that the results of system calculations are final.
 Limited consent: Usually, this would be control over the character's death.  A setting might strictly enforce In Character consequences, with or without a system, but allow the player an 'out' to avoid character death. For example, if it is decided that the character was mortally wounded, it might be allowable to alter in-game reality just slightly and instead have the character suffer only a serious wound.
 Consent:  Nothing can happen to a character without the player's approval.

Most RPGs have limited consent, allowing game masters some leeway if the player asks for it (in fact, almost total leeway, though this may destroy the believability of the scenario). Violating these rules and attempting to impose actions on another player's character without that player's consent is usually referred to as "god-modding" and most administrators have explicit rules prohibiting this practice.

Rules and Etiquette Systems 
Though there are countless different rules systems and game-specific rules, there is a single universal criterion that separates role-playing from collaborative writing — there must be a variable under the control of one or more players that some other players cannot control. The most common example of this is for each player participating in the activity to have their own characters that no other participant may write dialogs or actions for. Most separate textbased gameworlds have their own set of rules or TOS by which all users must consent to abide. In addition to rules there is usually a universal set of mores and a terminology common to text-based role playing games, that more or less constitutes gaming etiquette.

Some common examples of these rules are:

Enforcing a specific genre or theme on another that is not relevant to them i.e. their location.
Sticking to a certain 'point of view' without plausible reason to do so.
Observing correct grammar and spelling and use of a certain, default language to the best ability of the player.
Observing the rating of the game. Mature games may contain no restrictions on adult content.
Restrictions on or requirements to work together outside the story over plot and other elements.
Restrictions on:
who can contribute, and how often, when the work is being put together in an open area such as an online forum or mailing list.
Killing off or otherwise permanently changing a major character owned by another player without it being plausible or within the realism of the scenario.
Powergaming, twinking and/or godmoding.
Creating Mary Sues or characters with a set of characteristics or stats too beneficial to the player as to give them an unfair and unrealistic advantage over others.

Various forms of gaming that developed within these media, such as sparring (see below), have garnered their own cult following and developed their own sets of norms and subcultures over time.

Sparring 
Sparring is a form of online role-play that deals with combat between two or more characters, usually conducted on play-by-post media. Two or more players take turns in writing a joint-narrative battle, each one attempting to defeat his or her rival. The battle ends when one participant acknowledges defeat or one is judged the victor by an unbiased arbiter after a review of all related posts. In the context of Internet-based role-play, sparring retains its traditional meaning of play or practice combat, but is limited to written interaction. It is different from role-play in that sparring usually contributes little, if nothing, to a story or character development and participants are subject only to the rules of an agreed on role-play fighting system.

These fighting systems fall into three categories, speed-based, descriptive, and turn-based. Of these, the former is such that the involved parties seek to outmatch one another via superior typing speed and stratagem, and thus is usually left for websites or programs that support an instant messenger or chats. The latter has no emphasis on typing speed, but focuses wholly on strategy, and are thus usually based on forums and message boards. Both systems are further divided into explicit and implicit subsets (also called open and closed), which refer to whether the outcome of an attack is stated by the attacker or assumed to have happened in the flow of battle.

There is a large rift of ideologies within the community of sparring.  It comes from the basis of the spar's purpose and intent, and divides sparrers into two categories, being roleplayers and fighters. Roleplayers are grouped as "orthodox" combatants, where no "autos" are acceptable, and it is a mutually respectful practice.  Orthodox matches are completely based upon the honor system, and are held more to the ability of the character than the mechanics of the system.  Explicit guidelines and rules apply to the fighters, in an "unorthodox" system.  Unorthodox spars tend to use hit claims, as discussed above as open and closed.

Psychology of Roleplaying
Although an undeveloped field, there exists some research done on people who roleplay online. One interesting facet of roleplaying online is the instance of a roleplayer acting as a character of a different gender. One study was conducted in the Journal of Computer Game Culture, which discussed this phenomenon of cross-gendered play. In the study, it was found that roleplayers would create opposite gendered characters to revel in their own embodiment as alternative beings. This was a form of conscious adoption of the 'bodies' that the player could not physically 'own.' Although this creates a tension between the avatar of the character and the user, it is a tension that seems to not stand in the way of anything as players often show unselfconsciousness.

Additionally, research on online personalities has been done that could potentially extrapolate to the phenomena of online roleplaying. Researcher J. Suler found that, despite the various layers hiding the person behind the character, there is still a presence of the true personality of the roleplayer. Suler, in their study, highlighted several reasons for this extended emotional expression:

Dissociative Anonymity in that the roleplayer tends to not see the similarity between their online self and their offline self, although they are but two sides of the same coin.
Invisibility in that there is no worry about appearances when interacting online. This can lead to increased emotional expression as well.
Asynchronicity in that users can respond when they have time to, and there is no pressure to respond emotionally. This allows a better procession of emotions and thus heightened expression of the player's emotions.

References

Further reading
 Internet Game Timeline 1969-1990 
 

Online games
Multiplayer online games
MUDs
Browser games
Role-playing games